Jackson Stewart (born February 17, 1985) is an American film director, producer, and screenwriter. He is best known for directing Beyond the Gates (2016).

Early life 
Stewart was born in Tucson, Arizona.

Career 
In 2010, Stewart became director Stuart Gordon's personal assistant.

Stewart wrote the Frontierland episode of Supernatural.

Stewart directed Beyond the Gates (2016) starring Barbara Crampton, Chase Williamson, Graham Skipper, and Brea Grant.

In 2018, Stewart announced that he will direct The Day After Halloween on the Shock Waves podcast.

Stewart is currently developing a sequel to Beyond the Gates (2016) with Brian Yuzna.

Filmography 
Film

Television

References

External links 

1985 births
Living people
American directors
Horror film directors
Screenwriters from Arizona
Writers from Tucson, Arizona